South Paris is a census-designated place (CDP) located within the town of Paris in Oxford County, Maine, in the United States.  The population was 2,237 at the 2000 census. While the CDP refers only to the densely settled area in the southern part of the town of Paris, the entire town, outside of Paris Hill, is located within the South Paris ZIP code, resulting in many residents referring to the entire town as South Paris.

History
During the 19th-century, the Little Androscoggin River provided water power to operate mills in South Paris, and the village grew up around them.
The opening of the Atlantic and St. Lawrence Railroad on June 8, 1850 further spurred development of the small mill town.
In the 1890s, the Oxford County Courthouse moved from Paris Hill to be near the Grand Trunk Railway station. Much of the manufacturing and industry faded with the Great Depression, but South Paris remains the commercial section of Paris, and retains much of its Victorian era architecture. Oxford Hills Comprehensive High School, the regional high school, was founded in South Paris in 1961.  Actress Reta Shaw was born in South Paris in 1912.

Geography
South Paris is located at  (44.221609, -70.514603).

According to the United States Census Bureau, the CDP has a total area of 4.0 square miles (10.2 km), of which, 3.9 square miles (10.0 km) of it is land and 0.1 square miles (0.2 km) of it (2.03%) is water. South Paris is drained by the Little Androscoggin River.

The town is crossed by Maine State Route 26, 117, 118 and 119.
The town has a small park, Moore Park, with a new, fenced in playground for children to play in. Moore Park no longer has a water fountain, but there is a monument in the center with a gazebo to one side for public events.

Demographics

As of the census of 2008, there were 2,237 people, 972 households, and 536 families residing in the CDP. The racial makeup of the CDP was 97.32% White, 0.36% African American, 0.18% Native American, 1.34% Asian, 0.04% Pacific Islander, 0.04% from other races, and 0.72% from two or more races. Hispanic or Latino of any race were 0.49% of the population.

There were 972 households, out of which 25.0% had children under the age of 18 living with them, 40.5% were married couples living together, 11.1% had a female householder with no husband present, and 44.8% were non-families. 36.9% of all households were made up of individuals, and 17.3% had someone living alone who was 65 years of age or older. The average household size was 2.16 and the average family size was 2.84.

In the CDP, the population was spread out, with 20.4% under the age of 18, 9.9% from 18 to 24, 27.1% from 25 to 44, 21.4% from 45 to 64, and 21.2% who were 65 years of age or older. The median age was 39 years. For every 100 females, there were 90.4 males. For every 100 females age 18 and over, there were 86.3 males.

The median income for a household in the CDP was $27,569, and the median income for a family was $42,105. Males had a median income of $28,906 versus $19,960 for females. The per capita income for the CDP was $15,486. About 4.4% of families and 11.4% of the population were below the poverty line, including 8.7% of those under age 18 and 15.2% of those age 65 or over.

Notable people
Reta Shaw, actress
James Deering, industrial executive, socialite and antiquities collector
Hannibal Hamlin, First vice president for Abraham Lincoln

Sites of interest
 Celebration Barn Theater
 Paris Cape Historical Society

References

External links
 Town of Paris, Maine
 Paris Public Library
 Maine.gov -- Paris, Maine

Census-designated places in Maine
Census-designated places in Oxford County, Maine
Paris, Maine